An importer is a software application that reads in a data file or metadata information in one format and converts it to another format via special algorithms (such as filters).  An importer often is not an entire program by itself, but an extension to another program, implemented as a plug-in.  When implemented in this way, the importer reads the data from the file and converts it into the hosting application's native format.

For example, the data file for a 3D model may be written from a modeler, such as 3D Studio Max.  A game developer may then want to use that model in their game's  editor.  An importer, part of the editor, may read in the 3D Studio Max model and convert it to the game's native format so it can be used in game levels.

Importers are important tools in the video game industry. A plug-in or application that does the converse of an importer is called an exporter.

See also
 Data scraping 
 Web scraping
 Report mining
 Mashup (web application hybrid)
 Metadata
 Comparison of feed aggregators

Video game development